Brownington may refer to:
Brownington, Kentucky
 Brownington, Vermont
 Brownington, Missouri